Thomas S. Williams (August 28, 1806 – June 16, 1872) was a Republican United States Representative from Pennsylvania.

Williams was born in Greensburg, Pennsylvania.  He attended the common schools and graduated from Dickinson College in Carlisle, Pennsylvania in 1825.  In 1828, he was admitted to the Pennsylvania bar and began practicing in Greensburg.  In 1832, he moved to Pittsburgh, Pennsylvania, where he continued in private practice and edited the Advocate, a Whig newspaper.

Williams served in the Pennsylvania State Senate from 1838 to 1841, then returned to private practice.  During the American Civil War, Williams returned to public office, this time becoming a United States representative, a position he held from March 4, 1863 – March 4, 1869.

He was considered a Radical Republican during the Reconstruction era.

In his last term as representative, he was involved in matters of impeaching President Andrew Johnson. He wrote the majority report of the House Committee on Judiciary in support of impeachment at the conclusion of the first impeachment inquiry against Andrew Johnson in late 1867. The House ultimately voted to rejected the recommendation of impeachment at that time. Months later, after the impeachment of Johnson, Williams served as one of the House impeachment managers (roughly equivalent to a prosecutor) in the impeachment trial.

Williams lived in retirement until his death in Allegheny, Pennsylvania; his body is buried in Allegheny Cemetery in Pittsburgh.

References

External links

Pennsylvania state senators
Dickinson College alumni
Politicians from Pittsburgh
People of Pennsylvania in the American Civil War
Union (American Civil War) political leaders
1806 births
1872 deaths
Pennsylvania Whigs
Republican Party members of the United States House of Representatives from Pennsylvania
Burials at Allegheny Cemetery
19th-century American politicians